Dagmara "Dee" Avelar is the Illinois State Representative for the 85th district. She has held the position since January 13, 2021. The 85th district, located in the Chicago area, covers all or parts of Bolingbrook, Crest Hill, Fairmont, Lemont, Lockport, Naperville, Romeoville, and Woodridge.

Avelar was elected to succeed outgoing State Representative John Connor, who had been elected to the Illinois Senate.

Early life, education, and career
Avelar was born in Quito, Ecuador and moved to Bolingbrook, Illinois with her parents when she was 12. She graduated from Bolingbrook High School in 2005. She earned a Bachelor of Arts in Justice Studies with a minor in Political Science from Northeastern Illinois University in 2010 and earned her Master's Degree in Urban Planning and Policy Candidate at the University of Illinois at Chicago. She has been an active community organizer since 2008. She previously worked at Instituto Del Progreso Latino "as an accredited representative with a focus on citizenship and DACA." As of 2020, she works at the Illinois Coalition for Immigrant and Refugee Rights as Director of Programs.

Illinois House of Representatives

Committees
Avelar currently serves on six House committees and one House subcommittee: the Appropriations-Public Safety committee; the Cybersecurity, Data Analytics, & IT committee; the Health Care Availability & Access committee; the Judiciary - Civil committee; the State Government Administration committee; the Transportation: Regulation, Roads committee; as well as the Family Law & Probate subcommittee.

Legislation
Several bills filed by Rep. Avelar have gone on to become law. These include an amendment to the Environmental Protection Act that requires groundwater monitoring at some construction sites, legislation that requires hospitals to proactively offer charity care options to uninsured patients, and a statute that requires insurance companies that issue group accident and health policies to offer these policies to local chambers of commerce.

Electoral history

Personal life
Avelar resides in Bolingbrook, Illinois. She became a naturalized US citizen in April 2016.

References

External links
Representative Dagmara Avelar (D) at the Illinois General Assembly

21st-century American politicians
21st-century American women politicians
American politicians of Ecuadorian descent
Ecuadorian people
Hispanic and Latino American state legislators in Illinois
Hispanic and Latino American women in politics
Living people
Democratic Party members of the Illinois House of Representatives
Northeastern Illinois University alumni
University of Illinois Chicago alumni
Women state legislators in Illinois
Year of birth missing (living people)